"Waltzing in a Dream" is a 1932 song recorded by Bing Crosby. The lyrics were written by Bing Crosby and Ned Washington. The music was composed by Victor Young.

Bing Crosby recorded the song in Chicago on April 23, 1932 with Isham Jones and his Orchestra  and it was released as a Brunswick 78 single. The recording reached no. 6 on the pop singles chart in the U.S., with a chart run of eleven weeks.

Guy Lombardo also enjoyed chart success with the song in 1932. Other recordings were by Enric Madriguera for Columbia Records (catalog No. 2735D), and by  Ray Noble who recorded the song in London for HMV with a vocal by Al Bowlly.

See also

References

Sources
Grudens, Richard (2002). Bing Crosby – Crooner of the Century. Celebrity Profiles Publishing Co.. .
Macfarlane, Malcolm. Bing Crosby – Day By Day. Scarecrow Press, 2001.
Osterholm, J. Roger. Bing Crosby: A Bio-Bibliography. Greenwood Press, 1994.

Bing Crosby songs
1932 songs
Songs with music by Victor Young
Songs with lyrics by Ned Washington
Guy Lombardo songs